The Department of Works and Railways was an Australian government department that existed between November 1916 and April 1932. At its abolition, its functions were absorbed into the Department of the Interior.

Scope
Information about the department's functions and/or government funding allocation could be found in the Administrative Arrangements Orders, the annual Portfolio Budget Statements and in the department's annual reports.

At its creation, the department was responsible for the following:
Public works
Railways
Rivers

The department was responsible for preparing the plans to build Old Parliament House. It also prepared building plans for retail trading blocks in Manuka, Australian Capital Territory.

Structure
The department was a Commonwealth Public Service department, staffed by officials who were responsible to the Minister for Works and Railways. In order of appointment, the Department's Ministers were: Patrick Lynch, William Watt, Richard Foster, Percy Stewart, William Hill, William Gibson, Joseph Lyons, Albert Green and Charles Marr.

References

Ministries established in 1916
Works and Railways
1916 establishments in Australia
1932 disestablishments in Australia